Zoogonidae are a family of trematodes. They are the namesake family of the suborder Zoogonata in the order Plagiorchiida.

Selected genera are:
 Brevicreadium
 Deretrema Linton, 1910 
 Diphtherostomum Stossich, 1904 
 Glaucivermis Overstreet, 1971
 Limnoderetrema Bray, 1987
 Neozoogonus Arai, 1954
 Parvipyrum
 Oesophagotrema Chaari, Derbel & Neifar, 2011 
 Proparvipyrum
 Pseudochetosoma
 Pseudozoogonoides
 Steganoderma Stafford, 1904
 Zoogonoides Odhner, 1902
 Zoogonus Looss, 1901

Gallery of zoogonids

References 

Trematode families
Plagiorchiida